The Ministry of Home Affairs (MHA; ;), sometimes referred to as the Home Team, is a ministry of the Government of Singapore responsible for overseeing the national security, public security, civil defence, border control and immigration of Singapore.

History
The Ministry of Home Affairs was set up in 1959 when Singapore attained self-governance. Housed at the Empress Place Building, it remained there until 16 September 1963 when Singapore joined Malaysia and internal affairs became a federal responsibility.

After gaining independence on 9 August 1965, Home Affairs returned to Empress Place under the purview of the Ministry of Interior and Defence (MID). MID stayed there for several months before it was re-located to Pearl's Hill (former Lower Barracks of Police).

On 11 August 1970, the Ministry of Interior and Defence was separated into two ministries, the Ministry of Home Affairs and the Ministry of Defence. MHA remained at Pearl's Hill until August 1977 when it moved to Phoenix Park at Tanglin Road.

MHA, together with Police Headquarters, moved to its new premises at New Phoenix Park on 18 August 2001.

Organisational structure

Home Team Departments
The Ministry of Home Affairs consists of the following seven departments:

 Central Narcotics Bureau (CNB)
 Home Team Academy (HTA)
 Immigration and Checkpoints Authority (ICA)
 Internal Security Department (ISD)
 Singapore Civil Defence Force (SCDF)
 Singapore Police Force (SPF)
 Singapore Prison Service (SPS)

Statutory Boards
 Casino Regulatory Authority (CRA)
 Home Team Science and Technology Agency (HTX)
 Yellow Ribbon Singapore

Committees/Councils

 Presidential Council for Religious Harmony
 National Crime Prevention Council
 National Council Against Drug Abuse
 National Fire and Civil Emergency Preparedness Council

Ministers

The Ministry is headed by the Minister for Home Affairs, who is appointed as part of the Cabinet of Singapore. The incumbent minister is K. Shanmugam from the People's Action Party.

References

External links

Singapore Government Directory Interactive — Ministry of Home Affairs
MINDEF - 1965 - History of Ministry of Interior and Defence
Home Team News Portal

Home Affairs, Ministry of
Organisations of the Singapore Government
Singapore
Singapore Police Force
Singapore, Home Affairs
1959 establishments in Singapore